Thomas Baynton (5 October 1761 – 31 August 1820) was an English medical writer and surgeon.

Career
Baynton was from Bristol, where he served his apprenticeship with Mr. Smith, a physician of considerable eminence. He afterwards acquired a large practice of his own, and obtained a high reputation by discoveries in the curative part of his profession, especially in the treatment of ulcers and wounds.

He published Descriptive Account of a New Method of treating Ulcers of the Leg (1797, dedicated to Anthony Fothergill), and An Account of a Successful Method of treating Diseases of the Spine (1813, dedicated to Edward Jenner).

Personal life 
Thomas Baynton married Ann Swayne (1762–1846) on 22 May 1784. They had seven children:

 Thomas Baynton (1792 – June 1874) married Jane Dorothy Williams (1814–1890), they had one child: 
 Agnes Elizabeth Baynton (1837 – 4 January 1906).
 Ann Swayne Baynton (1793 – 9 December 1882).
 Elizabeth Baynton (1 March 1796 – ?).
 Mary Baynton (1799 – 4 June 1884) married John Sidney Farrell (21 March 1800 – 17 December 1882) on 7 September 1824 in Powick Worcestershire. They had ten children:
Mary Jane Farrell (22 July 1825 – 25 March 1895) married Frederick Lewis David (1831 – 20 February 1879), they had six children.
Anne Catherine Frances Farrell (23 July 1826 – 29 January 1892)
Isabella Farrell (February 1828 – 10 August 1828)
Sidney Baynton Farrell (25 March 1829 – 7 September 1879) married Emily Elizabeth Jarvis (13 April 1827 – 19 August 1912) on 24 June 1854 in Toronto Canada.
Adelaide Farrell (13 October 1830 – 12 December 1906)
Geraldine Farrell (13 October 1830 – 1 November 1908) married Reginald Onslow Farmer (14 May 1828 – 3 April 1904) in 1851 in Canada. They had seven children including:
Mary Frances Farmer (10 August 1857 – 18 May 1929) who married Henry O'Callaghan Prittie (1851–1927) the 4th Baron Dunalley.
Frances Farrell (1833 – 24 January 1908)
Helen Mackenzie Farrell (1835 – 20 October 1907) married Richard Geaves (1815 – 24 September 1886) they had three children.
Henry Chamberlayne Farrell (9 December 1836 – 7 July 1889) married Sophia Margaret Watson Webb (1830 – 1 December 1919), they had five children.
Rosa Sophia Farrell (26 February 1842 – 14 May 1897) married William Henry Anthony (9 November 1838 – 5 March 1922) on 28 September 1865 at Lee Kent. They had two children.
 Sarah Baynton (1801–1871) married Percival North Bastard (1784–1848) on 15 August 1822 in Melksham Wiltshire. They had eight children:
Emily Bastard (1824 – 17 March 1890)
Augusta Bastard (1825 – )
Rosa Louisa Bastard (1826–1878) married Edmund George Bankes (24 April 1826 – 28 January 1860) in 1848 in Blandford.
Frances Isabella Bastard (1829–1897)
Mary Jane Bastard (1834 – )
Lucy Bastard (1837 – )
Catherine Octavia Bastard (1838 – 17 August 1913)
Elizabeth Bastard (1839 – )
 Susan Baynton (1801 – 23 May 1871).
 Frances Jane Baynton (1807–1882) married Robert Forsayth (died 1840). They had one daughter: 
 Frances Jane Forsayth (1839 – 5 September 1899), poet, Arno’s Waters and other poems (1865), The Maria-Stieg and other poems (1873), The Student’s twilight: or, tales in verse (1878).

Death
He died at Clifton on 31 August 1820.

References

1761 births
1820 deaths
Medical doctors from Bristol
English medical writers
19th-century English non-fiction writers
English surgeons
19th-century English medical doctors